Malayotyphlops hypogius, also known as the Cebu blind snake or Cebu Island worm snake, is a species of snake in the Typhlopidae family.

References

hypogius
Reptiles described in 1950